Oro Win is a moribund Chapacuran language spoken along the upper stretches of the Pacaás Novos River in Brazil.

Oro Win is one of only five languages known to make use of a voiceless bilabially post-trilled dental stop, .

As of 2010, there were only six known speakers of Oro Win in Brazil, and all of them were over 50 years of age.

Phonology

Literature 
 Everett, Daniel; & Kern, B. (1996). Wari’: The Pacaas Novos language of western Brazil. London: Routledge.
 Ladefoged, Peter; Everett, Daniel. (1996). The status of phonetic rarities. Language, 72 (4), 794–800.

References

External links
Oro Win: Povos Indígenas no Brasil - Instituto Socioambiental
Linguistics Professor Discovers New Language in Brazilian Rain Forest. Pittsburgh University Times v. 27 n. 4 (1994). (offline, but see this copy)

Chapacuran languages
Endangered Chapacuran languages